AnimaNaturalis is an international non profit animal rights organization whose mission is to "Establish, promote and protect the rights of all animals in Spain and Latin America. These rights include the right to life, liberty, and not to be tortured stop being considered property." It was founded in March, 2003 by Leonora Esquivel Frías and Francisco Vásquez Neira.

AnimaNaturalis has offices in Spain, as well as several Latin American countries (Argentina, Chile, Colombia, Ecuador, Mexico, and Venezuela).

Programs

AnimaNaturalis speaks out against the use of the animals as food (concerns with industrial farms, industrial fishing and foie gras); in laboratories (animal testing); to wear as clothing (concerns with using fur, leather, silk, wool and feathers); as entertainment (circuses, zoos, aquariums, sports, hunting, and racing); and raises awareness about cruel traditions such as rodeos, bullfighting, cockfighting, and dogfighting.

Companion animal programs include education about issues like keeping pets out of hot cars, the importance of spaying and neutering, and pet adoption. They also raise awareness about the connection between abuse of animals and violence toward humans, including children.

Selected history

In 2008, the famous Spanish singer Alaska collaborated with them in a joint campaign with PETA, posing nude in a picture to raise awareness for what she considers cruel activity, bullfighting.

AnimaNaturalis has also organized protests against the skin industry, like Sin Piel, (No Fur) which became the single most massive protest on this subject ever done in Spain. It has also been realised in Argentina, where they counted with the collaboration of the actress Marcela Kloosterboer.

In Chile, they organize annual marches against the mistreatment undergone by young bulls in the Chilean rodeo. The last march, which took place September 6, 2008, had the collaboration of the Chilean dancer Maura Rivera.

See also
List of animal rights groups

References

External links 
  (Spanish language)

2003 establishments in Spain
Animal rights organizations
Animal welfare organisations based in Spain
Criticisms of bullfighting
Organizations established in 2003